Shahrak-e Jub Baghan (also Romanized as Shahrak-e Jūb Bāghān) is a village in Direh Rural District, in the Central District of Gilan-e Gharb County, Kermanshah Province, Iran. At the 2006 census, its population was 517, in 118 families.

References 

Populated places in Gilan-e Gharb County